Jay Jostyn (December 13, 1901 – June 25, 1976) was an actor in the era of old-time radio. He is best known for portraying the title role in Mr. District Attorney on radio. An article in Radio-TV Mirror in 1952 reported, "He is so generally believed to be a real life lawyer that he frequently receives mail from listeners inviting him to move to certain cities where they feel crimes are going unsolved."

Early years
Jostyn was born Eugene Josten, the son of George and Mary Josten of Milwaukee, Wisconsin. He attended St. Joseph's parochial school, Marquette Academy, Marquette University, and the Wisconsin Conservatory of Music.

Before going into acting full-time, he had a job with a telephone company.

Stage
In 1948, Jostyn had the lead in a touring company that performed The Trial of Mary Dugan. On Broadway, he played District Attorney McDonough in Deadfall (1955).

Radio
Jostyn's career in radio began at WLW in Cincinnati, Ohio, when he was the first poetry reader for the station's late-night Moon River program.

Jostyn's roles as a regular cast member included those shown in the table below.

Jostyn was also in the casts of This Small Town, Silver Theater, The Top Guy, and Mystery Man.

Television
Jostyn's roles as a regular cast member included those show in the table below.

Jostyn also starred in Night Court U.S.A. a syndicated series that dramatized actual court cases. Additionally, he was also seen in episodes of The Doctor, and The Philco Television Playhouse.

Other professional activities
In November 1943, Jostyn was elected to a one-year term as third vice-president of the New York local of the American Federation of Radio Artists. In 1944, he was one of seven people elected to AFRA's national board.

Personal life
On October 17, 1928, Jostyn married Ruth Hill in Pasadena, California. She was an actress whom he met when they performed together in a play. They had two sons, Jean Charles and Jon George.

Death
Jostyn died June 25, 1976, in Los Angeles, California.

References

External links

1901 births
1976 deaths
American male radio actors
American male television actors
20th-century American male actors
Male actors from Milwaukee
Marquette University alumni
Wisconsin Conservatory of Music alumni